Redemption (Italian: Redenzione) is a 1919 silent Italian drama film directed by Carmine Gallone and starring Diana Karenne, Alberto Pasquali and Elisa Severi.

Cast
 Diana Karenne as Maria di Magdala
 Alberto Pasquali as Gesù
 Pépa Bonafé as Salomè
 Luigi Rossi as Erode
 Elisa Severi as Erodiade
 Camillo De Rossi as Il Centurione
 Palloe as Mercante Egizio
 Luigi Duse
 Salvatore Mereu
 Salvatore Ramponi

References

External links
 

1919 films
1919 drama films
Italian silent feature films
Italian black-and-white films
Films directed by Carmine Gallone
Italian drama films
Silent drama films